Bolsas y Mercados Españoles (BME) is the Spanish company that deals with the organizational aspects of the Spanish stock exchanges and financial markets, which includes the stock exchanges in Madrid, Barcelona, Bilbao and Valencia. In addition to the trading of shares and bonds, BME offers access to a number of other products (warrants, trackers) and the clearing and settlement of operations. BME is also developing a technological consultancy, operating in 23 countries and mainly providing trading systems.

BME owns the stocks exchanges of Madrid, Barcelona, Valencia and Bilbao as well as Latibex, the only international market for Latin American securities, and the company Openfinance, a provider of technology in the wealth management industry. BME also holds a participation in the Cámara de Riesgo Central de Contraparte of Colombia and the Mexican Stock Exchange.

BME has been a listed company since 14 July 2006 and an IBEX 35 constituent since July 2007 until December 2015. As of 2019, it is among the smallest of Europe’s exchanges with a market capitalisation of 2.1 billion euros ($2.32 billion), less than half of Euronext’s 5.2 billion euros.

In 2020, Six Group, that already owns the Swiss Stock Exchange finalised the purchase of BME.

See also

Bolsa de Madrid
List of stock exchanges

References

Spanish companies established in 2002
Companies based in Madrid
Financial services companies established in 2002
Financial services companies of Spain
Companies listed on the Madrid Stock Exchange
2006 initial public offerings
2020 mergers and acquisitions